Alex T. Atamanenko (born January 24, 1945) is a Canadian politician, who was elected to the House of Commons in 2006, winning the riding of British Columbia Southern Interior for the New Democratic Party in the 2006 federal election, and served in parliament until his retirement at the 2015 federal election. He is also a retired school teacher.

Biography
Atamanenko was born in New Westminster, and was educated at the University of British Columbia and the University of Toronto.  Atamanenko has a bachelor's degree in physical education, a teaching diploma, and a Master of Arts degree in Russian. Atamanenko is a member of the British Columbia Retired Teachers Association. He taught Russian, French and English at a number of schools across Canada and the United States. He also has experience in recreation and physical education with a number of organizations, including the Boys' Clubs of Vancouver, the Canadian Forces Base in Portage la Prairie, Manitoba, and for the Coquitlam and New Westminster recreation departments, where he was part-time leader and co-ordinator, as well as for the government of the Yukon as a co-ordinator for the Canada Games (1976–1977) and a recreation consultant (1977–1979). He was also a freelance translator, and is a karate instructor with the Castlegar Karate Club. Other community activities include involvement with the Canadian Youth Hostelling Association in Whitehorse and serving on the Coaching Council of Canada during the 1970s.

He contested the riding of Southern Interior, as it was called then, in the federal election of 2004; he lost narrowly to the incumbent Conservative MP, Jim Gouk.

Atamanenko contested the riding again in the 2006 federal election, which became open when Gouk left federal politics. His candidacy received a significant boost after the Conservative candidate, Derek Zeisman, was disowned by the party after being caught trying to smuggle alcohol across the U.S.–Canada border. Atamanenko won by over 13,000 votes. He was re-elected in the 2008 and 2011 elections, in the latter case gaining 50.9% of valid ballots cast in his riding.

Atamanenko paid homage to NDP leader Jack Layton after his bout with cancer, saying "Jack was the epitome of a trustworthy, honourable politician who inspired many Canadians, regardless of their political allegiance. He cared deeply about our country, and he really gave his life to it. Jack appealed to the best in people. He gave so many young people, who are rightly critical of many aspects of our electoral system, something to believe in, something to hope for in what he was trying to achieve and the vision he shared with so many in our party."

Electoral record

		

|- bgcolor="white"

|align="left" colspan=2|NDP gain from Conservative
|align="right"|Swing
|align="right"|+15.6
|align="right"|

References

External links 

 

1945 births
Canadian people of Russian descent
Living people
Members of the House of Commons of Canada from British Columbia
New Democratic Party MPs
People from New Westminster
University of British Columbia alumni
University of Toronto alumni
21st-century Canadian politicians